Purpuradusta microdon is species of tropical sea snail, a cowry, a marine gastropod mollusk in the family Cypraeidae, the cowries. This species lives in the Indo-Pacific oceans.

The shell of this cowry closely resembles that of Purpuradusta minoridens.

Subspecies
 Purpuradusta microdon microdon (Gray, 1828)
 Purpuradusta microdon chrysalis (Kiener, 1843)

Distribution
This species is distributed in the Red Sea and in the Indian Ocean along Chagos, Kenya, the Mascarene Basin, Mauritius and Tanzania.

References

 Burgess, C.M. (1970). The Living Cowries. AS Barnes and Co, Ltd. Cranbury, New Jersey

External links
 On-line articles with Cypraea microdon in the HAWAIIAN SHELL NEWS (1960-1994)

Cypraeidae
Gastropods described in 1828
Taxa named by John Edward Gray